Capo Colonne ("Cape of Columns") may refer to: 
Promunturium Lacinium, Calabria
Sounion, Attica